Phyllanthus acuminatus, the Jamaican gooseberry tree, is a herb-like plant of the family Phyllanthaceae, found in the Caribbean, Central America and South America.

Uses
This plant is used by the Choco as a piscicide.

acuminatus
Taxa named by Martin Vahl
Flora of Mexico
Flora of South America